John Whitelaw (born 1943 in New York) is an American harpsichordist and longtime faculty member of the Royal Conservatory in Ghent. After studies in Chicago, he was a student of Kenneth Gilbert in Montreal from 1967-1971. In 1970 he won the Prix d'Europe. In 1971 he won second prize at the competition Musica Antiqua Bruges and first prize at the international harpsichord competition in Paris. He has appeared as a guest artist on numerous recordings, and in 1996 released his own album dedicated to the works of William Byrd.

He has also played the clavichord, the forte-piano and the piano, in particular accompanying soprano Gerda Hartman in the repertoire of the German Lied.

References

Living people
American harpsichordists
1943 births